The Marchreisenspitze, at 2,620 m, is the fifth highest summit of the Kalkkögel in the Stubai Alps. Together with the Ampferstein and the Malgrubenspitze, they form the well known Dreigestirn ("Three Stars") above the Axamer Lizum, which are visible far into the Inn valley.

Ascent 
The most popular route to the top is the "Lustige Bergler Steig", an easy klettersteig, that runs from Halsl over the Ampferstein and up to the Marchreisenspitze. From Ampferstein, the route climbs past the southern side of the Kehlbachlspitzen before leading to the south flank of the Marchreisenspitze. It crosses a boulder-strewn ravine and several ledges before reaching the summit.

Another ascent is the one from the Gsallerweg through the southwest flank.

There are also several routes through the large gravel field of the Lizum or from the Schlick valley head to the south.

Gallery

Literature 

Two-thousanders of Austria
Stubai Alps
Mountains of Tyrol (state)
Mountains of the Alps